The Texas–Texas A&M football rivalry is an American college football rivalry between the Texas Longhorns and the Texas A&M Aggies. The rivalry was played every year between 1915 and 2011, until A&M left the Big 12 Conference to join the Southeastern Conference during the 2010–12 Southeastern Conference realignment as a part of the wider 2010–2014 NCAA conference realignment. Texas currently leads the series 76–37–5.

History
The first meeting was in 1894. By 1911, Texas led the series 15–4–2. The series went back and forth until 1939, but Texas still led 27–15–4. After that, Texas went 36–7–1. A&M then won 10 of the next 11 games in the series. Texas then won 12 of the last 17 games in the rivalry.

In July 2011, A&M elected to join the Southeastern Conference beginning in 2012. The move to switch conferences resulted in the ending of the annual rivalry. On November 24, 2011, Texas faced A&M in College Station in the final scheduled annual meeting. Texas won 27–25 on a field goal as time expired. In January 2013, a Texas state legislator filed a bill that would require them to play each other every year. The bill was referred to the House Committee on Higher Education on February 18, 2013.

Attempts to revive the series
In June 2017, A&M's former athletic director, Bill Byrne, was quoted in an article saying, "Their AD (DeLoss Dodds) at the time came out and said we will never play Texas A&M again, and they worked along with Baylor and the conference to have no one in the (Big 12) schedule us... there were other forces at work to make sure we didn't play." Byrne was referring to five years before that when he was still A&M's athletic director and A&M was in the midst of transitioning to the Southeastern Conference.

In September 2017, University of Texas students were polled in a university-wide referendum in which 96.71 percent said "Yes" when asked if they were in favor of bringing the game back or not. Later, in February 2019, during Texas A&M's spring student body elections, 88.71 percent (13,359) of 15,060 voters said "Yes" when asked if they were in favor of bringing the game back as a non-conference matchup. Both polls had been organized by a student-led movement entitled, "Reinstate the Rivalry" which used student representatives from both schools.

In December 2017, Chris Del Conte was named athletic director of the University of Texas. Shortly thereafter, Del Conte contacted Texas A&M athletic director Scott Woodward with a proposition to schedule a home-and-home series in 2022-23, but Woodward declined, as Texas A&M's non-conference schedule was already filled for those seasons. Again in 2019 during a panel at the 2019 Texas Tribune Festival, Del Conte stated his support for a resumption of the series.

In November 2018, GOP San Antonio Rep. Lyle Larson proposed and filed a bill that would require Texas and Texas A&M to play every year on or around Thanksgiving day. In February 2019, the bill gained the support of Texas Governor Greg Abbott who also voiced support for the resumption of the rivalry. The bill never gained wide support and died in committee, but later in June 2019, Gov. Abbott stated that he had been working with leadership of both universities to schedule a two-game matchup at some future point.

In July 2019, coaches of both schools' football teams reaffirmed their desire to resume the rivalry game.

Resumption of the rivalry 
On July 21, 2021, it was rumored that Texas will leave the Big 12 Conference to join the Southeastern Conference, which would mean the rivalry would resume as a conference game.  On July 26, Texas, along with Oklahoma, announced their intentions to leave the Big 12 Conference, and the next day officially applied to be members of the Southeastern Conference. The conference would then unanimously vote to extend invitations to the two schools, which were accepted by the two institutions the next day of July 30, officially making them future members of the conference no later than 2025., and in early 2023, it was announced that Texas would join the conference one year earlier in 2024. This means that Texas and Texas A&M will play again, reviving the series after what will be 13 years of dormancy.

Aspects of the rivalry
Each school mentions the other in its fight song ("and it's goodbye to A&M" in Texas Fight; Texas is mentioned twice in the second verse of the Aggie War Hymn). The football series was the third longest in college football. The last regular season football game was usually reserved for the match-up. Each school has elaborate pregame preparations for the annual football clash, including the Aggie Bonfire and Hex Rally. Texas had a unique lighting scheme for the UT Tower after beating Texas A&M. The State Farm Lone Star Showdown, a full sports rivalry between the two schools, began in 2004, and ended in 2012 when Texas A&M moved to the Southeastern Conference.

Game results

In popular culture
In October 2006, General Mills announced they would honor the then third-longest running college football rivalry with a special edition Wheaties box. The box featured the helmets of Texas and Texas A&M and their respective home stadiums, Darrell K Royal–Texas Memorial Stadium and Kyle Field, on either side. Although several individual college basketball and football teams had been featured previously on special edition boxes, this was the first time Wheaties had honored a rivalry series.

The game's tradition figures into the plot of the 1978 stage musical The Best Little Whorehouse in Texas and its film adaptation; in the show, each year the game's winners (in the story, the Aggies) would celebrate at the "Chicken Ranch," until an overzealous news reporter (a character based on Marvin Zindler) endeavors to close the legendary brothel.

See also 
 List of NCAA college football rivalry games
 List of most-played college football series in NCAA Division I
 Lone Star Showdown

References

College football rivalries in the United States
Texas Longhorns football
Texas A&M Aggies football
2011 disestablishments in Texas
1894 establishments in Texas